Witchfire is an upcoming first-person shooter video game by The Astronauts for Windows. The game is set to release in early access in early 2023 as an Epic Games Store exclusive.

Gameplay
Witchfire is to be an action-oriented, skill-based first-person shooter game with no cutscenes. The game would also feature elements commonly found in roguelike games.

Development and release
During the initial development, beginning towards the end of 2015, the game was being designed as a post-apocalyptic, science fiction survival simulator code-named "Astro Project 2", before turning into a dark fantasy first-person shooter. Witchfire was officially revealed at The Game Awards 2017. The Astronauts announced in January 2022 that Witchfire would be released via early access in late 2022. However, in October 2022, it was announced that the early access date has been postponed to early 2023.

As of 2019, the development team has nine full members with three contributors. The game is unrelated to the director Adrian Chmielarz's earlier Doom-style Painkiller (2004) and was also influenced by FromSoftware's Dark Souls and Bungie's Destiny series. Its art direction inspirations include works of American landscape painters such as Thomas Hill, Albert Bierstadt, and Frederic Edwin Church.

References

External links
  of The Astronauts, including a weekly-updated Witchfire development blog

Upcoming video games
Alternate history video games
Fantasy video games
First-person shooters
Single-player video games
Unreal Engine games
Video games developed in Poland
Video games set in the 15th century
Video games about witchcraft
Windows-only games
Windows games
Early access video games